Dwayne Joseph (born June 2, 1972) is an American football executive and former player who is the director of pro scouting for the Las Vegas Raiders of the National Football League (NFL).

Playing career

College
Joseph was a letterman in his college career, and was the captain of the Syracuse Orange football team in his senior year.

National Football League

Chicago Bears

After going undrafted, Joseph played for the Bears from 1994 to 1996. He spent much of his rookie season with the practice squad. In 1995, Joseph recorded his first career interception in his pro debut. He eventually played in all 16 games, and started one. During the 1995 season, Joseph recorded two interceptions, four passes defended, and a forced fumble. He spent the 1996 season on injured reserve, and was released in training camp a year later.

Executive career

Chicago Bears

Three years after his playing career ended, Joseph was hired by the Bears to be the Coordinator of Player Programs, and was promoted to Director of Player Development in 2001.

Miami Dolphins

In 2004, Joseph was hired as a pro scout for the Miami Dolphins.

In 2005, Joseph became the Dolphins representative at the NFL-Stanford University Program for Managers. In 2007, Joseph became the Dolphins assistant director of pro personnel.

Chicago Bears (second stint)

In 2012, Joseph was hired by new Bears general manager Phil Emery as assistant director of pro scouting.

On May 6, 2013, Joseph was promoted to assistant director of pro personnel.

Philadelphia Eagles 

Joseph was hired as the director of pro personnel of Philadelphia Eagles in May 2015. Joseph won his first Super Bowl when the Eagles defeated the New England Patriots in Super Bowl LII.

Oakland / Las Vegas Raiders
In 2019, Joseph was hired by the Oakland Raiders as their director of pro scouting.

Personal life

Joseph attended college at Syracuse University, and earned his undergraduate degree in human development, along with a master's degree in education leadership at DePaul University.

Father to Damien Joseph who goes to St. Augustine Prep and lives in Mullica Hill, 16 years old.

References

External links
 Chicago Bears bio
 Bio on ESPN

1972 births
Living people
Players of American football from Miami
Sports coaches from Miami
Chicago Bears players
Syracuse Orange football players
Miami Dolphins scouts
Chicago Bears coaches
Syracuse University alumni
American football defensive backs